Dheer Charan Srivastav also known as D. C. Srivastav (born 9 August 1967), is an Indian character actor, comedian and dialogue writer from Hyderabad, Telangana, who mostly appears in Hyderabad Deccani Urdu, Tollywood  and Bollywood Films. He is most notable for his role as Ismail Bhai in comedy films, The Angrez (2006), Hyderabad Nawabs (2006) and Hungama in Dubai (2007). He is also known for his Hyderabadi dialect humor.

Early life and education

Srivastav was born and brought up in Hyderabad. He grew up at Himaytnagar locality, and studied at Daffodils School, where his mother Pushpa Srivastav taught Hindi. He completed his intermediate from St. Anthony's High School, Hyderabad in 1985. Later he graduated from Osmania University in 1995.

Career
Prior to films, he was a Network Techno Marketing Manager in Hyderabad. He is quite adept in comedy and character roles. He holds the Best Hyderabadi Deccani Urdu Comedian Award for acting in The Angrez. He acted in Bollywood movie with the Indian Film Director Ram Gopal Varma's (RGV) Department.

Filmography

As actor
Note that Hindi may refer to the Deccani film industry.

References

External links
 
 
 

Indian male film actors
1967 births
Living people
Male actors from Hyderabad, India
Male actors in Telugu cinema
Indian male comedians
21st-century Indian male actors
Screenwriters from Hyderabad, India
Male actors in Hindi cinema